St Mary's is the cathedral church of the Roman Catholic Diocese of Ossory. It is situated on James's Street, Kilkenny, Ireland.

Saint Mary's was designed by William Deane Butler (c.1794-1857). He was chosen by Bishop William Kinsella (1793-1845) who instigated the building of St. Mary's in February 1842. Work began in April 1843 and finished in 1857.  On Sunday 4 October 1857, St. Mary's had its grand opening, which consisted of a two-and-three-quarter hour ceremony that began at 6.15am. The cost of the building is estimated to have been £25,000.

St. Mary's is made from cut-limestone which was sourced locally. The cathedral has a cruciform plan and its style is described as ‘Early English Gothic’. The design is believed to have been based on Gloucester Cathedral in Gloucester, England. It is situated on the highest point in Kilkenny City and is a significant local landmark.

The cathedral is variously referred to as "St Mary’s", "the church of St Kieran" and "the Cathedral of the Assumption". Its bell in the steeple was made by John Murphy, a Dublin foundry. It rings every 15 minutes, 24 hours a day, marking the quarter hour, half hour and hour with different patterns and an extended peal of bells marks midday and midnight.

St. Mary's has a noted sculpture of the Madonna by Giovanni Maria Benzoni (1809-1873).

Gallery

References

External links

  St. Mary’s website.
 St. Mary's cathedral on the National Inventory of Architectural Heritage website
 A good history of St Mary's here
 A biography of  William Deane Butler 
 A List of architects and designers that worked on St Mary's Cathedral.

Roman Catholic cathedrals in the Republic of Ireland
Roman Catholic Diocese of Ossory
Gothic Revival church buildings in the Republic of Ireland
1842 establishments in Ireland
Religious organizations established in 1842
Roman Catholic churches in Kilkenny (city)
Roman Catholic churches completed in 1857
19th-century Roman Catholic church buildings in Ireland
19th-century churches in the Republic of Ireland